Sergey Sergeyevich Kramarenko (20 May 1946 – 25 March 2008) was a Soviet football player who played the majority of his career in Azerbaijan as a goalkeeper for PFC Neftchi Baku. He was classified as a Master of Sport of the USSR in 1966 following Neftchi's third-place finish in the Soviet Top League that year. He was born in Moscow.

Kramarenko holds the Azerbaijani football record for the most games played in the Soviet Top League with 312 caps.  The keeper was unofficially named Azerbaijan's Player of the Year once, in 1970.

Following his playing career, which included stints for the Ukrainian side FC Chornomorets Odesa and another Azerbaijani club FK Khazar Lenkoran, Kramarenko became football manager for Khazar Lenkoran and for another, smaller Azerbaijani club.  He was named manager of Neftchi in 1993. He died in March 2008 in Moscow.

He was the father of Dmitry Kramarenko, who played was a goalkeeper, most notable for Dinamo Moscow and the Azerbaijan national football team.

References

External links
 

1946 births
2008 deaths
Soviet footballers
Azerbaijani footballers
FC Chornomorets Odesa players
Neftçi PFK managers
Honoured Masters of Sport of the USSR
Sportspeople from Ganja, Azerbaijan
Association football goalkeepers
Neftçi PFK players
Azerbaijani football managers
Soviet football managers